Taiarapu-Ouest (literally "Ta'iarapu West") is a commune of French Polynesia, an overseas territory of France in the Pacific Ocean. The commune of Tai'arapu-Ouest is located on the island of Tahiti, in the administrative subdivision of the Windward Islands, themselves part of the Society Islands. At the 2017 census it had a population of 8,078.

The commune extends over half of the peninsula of Tahiti Iti ("small Tahiti", a.k.a. Tai'arapu).

Taiarapu-Ouest consists of the following associated communes:

 Teahupoo
 Toahotu
 Vairao

The administrative centre of the commune is the settlement of Vairao.

Population

References

Communes of French Polynesia